Allan Anderson (4 February 1944 – 2 November 2013) was an Australian rules footballer who played for the Fitzroy Football Club in the Victorian Football League (VFL).

Anderson crossed to Williamstown in the VFA in 1966 and played 15 games in his only season with the Seagulls, kicking one goal.

Notes

External links 
		

1944 births
2013 deaths
Australian rules footballers from Victoria (Australia)
Fitzroy Football Club players